6'.2" is a 2005 Indian Tamil language comedy thriller film directed by V. Senthil Kumar. The film stars Sathyaraj, newcomer Sunitha Varma and Vadivelu, whilst music for the film was composed by D. Imaan. The film was released on 12 May 2005.

Plot
James and Mr. White work in a call centre in Chennai. James witnesses the murder of Krishnamurthy, a labor union leader. He promises the police to identify the murderer. In order to crack the case, a police inspector Soundarapandian urges the lady informer Aishwarya to act as James's wife and stay in a house opposite to Krishnamurthy's. Upon coming to the house, the couple tries to crack the case. In this regard, they befriend the family, but soon, Krishnamurthy's father is also murdered. Towards the interval, one realises that James is the murderer. In order to avenge the murder of his parents by Krishnamurthy and his brother Ramamurthy a few years ago, James stays in the house opposite to theirs. With knowledge of his motive, Aishwarya promises to help him in bumping off Ramamurthy, who returns from Australia.

Cast

Sathyaraj as James (Balamurugan)
Sunitha Varma as Aishwarya
Vadivelu as Mr. White
Raveendran as Ramamurthy
Raj Kapoor as Sundarapandian
Ajay Rathnam as Krishnamurthy
Devadarshini as Meenakshi
Manobala as Krishnamurthy's father
Vincent Asokan as Devaraj
Thyagu as shop owner
Madhan Bob
Singamuthu
Bonda Mani
Rinku Ghosh
Bava Lakshmanan

Soundtrack
The soundtrack was composed by D. Imman.

Lyrics were written by Pa. Vijay and Snehan.

References

2005 films
2000s Tamil-language films